Estadio Miguel Grau is a multi-use stadium in the Bellavista District of Callao, Peru. The stadium is part of the Sport Village of Callao (Villa Deportiva del Callao) or Yahuar Huaca, which is owned by the Callao Regional Government since 2011. Its use is available to several football teams in the region including Sport Boys, Universidad de San Martín and Academia Cantolao who play their home matches here for the Torneo Descentralizado. The stadium's maximum capacity is 17,000 and was inaugurated on 16 June 1996 with a match between Sport Boys and Deportivo Pesquero for the 1996 Torneo Descentralizado. The match was a 3–1 win for Sport Boys. Floodlight towers were installed in 2003.

References

External links

Miguel Grau
Sport Boys
Buildings and structures in Callao Region